Now dissolved, Asia Universal Bank (AUB) was the largest commercial bank in Kyrgyzstan, holding about a quarter of the combined assets and deposits reported by the entire Kyrgyz banking system. The bank was highly regarded internationally, and received a number of awards, from organizations such as The Banker, Global Finance, The Asian Banker and Euromoney, but subsequently fell from grace.

Operations
Originally focused on corporate banking, AUB had actively expanded into retail banking and was the fastest growing mortgage provider in the country.  At the time of its existence AUB was the only company in the country to have received an international credit rating.  However, following the fall of the Bakiyev regime the bank was nationalised following a wide scale money laundering scandal.

AUB operated 90 branches in the Kyrgyz Republic and had representative offices in Riga, Latvia, which opened in 2002, Kyiv, Ukraine and Almaty, Kazakhstan.

History
On 22 August 1997, the International Business Bank was established with a branch in Kyrgyzstan which became the AsiaUniversalBank (AUB) in 2000.

For $150,000 in 1999, Mikhael Nadel, a Russian businessman, purchased from a Western Samoan bank known as the International Business Bank its Kyrgyz subsidiary and renamed it Asia Universal Bank in 2000. Prior to beginning his operations in Kyrgyzstan, Nadal had similar operations in independent Ukraine.

Through accounts at AUB, very large sums were allegedly money laundered in a scheme involving Maxim Bakiyev, son of the former Kyrgyzstan president Kurmanbek Bakiyev, while the younger Bakiyev was chairman of the board of directors at the Kyrgyz Development Fund.

In 2006, Central Bank of Russia declared AsiaUniversalBank as undesirable.

According the Party of Regions' accounting book, Paul Manafort, who after the Orange Revolution provided strong support to Viktor Yanukovych, received funds in his Wachovia bank account in Virginia from the Party of Regions via the Belize based Neocom Systems Limited's AUB account on 14 October 2009. On 30 July 2014, Manafort was questioned by the FBI about his Wachovia bank account and his relationship with Neocom Systems which he had never heard of Neocom.

After the 7 April 2010 revolution, AUB was declared insolvent in October 2010, nationalized, and broken up.

In April 2011, Mikhail Nadel was found guilty of numerous crimes including money laundering in absentia by a Kyrgyz court.

Notes

References

External links
 АзияУниверсалБанк - official site in Russian
 AsiaUniversalBank - official site in English
 АзияУниверсалБанкы - official site in Kyrgyz
 AsiaUniversalBank - official site in Chinese
 AsiaUniversalBank - not official site in Kazhakhstan

Companies of Kyrgyzstan